The Senator Nat G. Kiefer University of New Orleans Lakefront Arena (commonly Lakefront Arena or UNO Lakefront Arena) is an 8,933-seat multi-purpose arena located in New Orleans, Louisiana. The arena is home to the University of New Orleans Privateers men's and women's basketball teams.

It was built in 1983 and renamed in 1986 in honor of Nat G. Kiefer, the late state senator who aided UNO's efforts to obtain state funding for the building. Kiefer's state senate district included the UNO campus. It is part of the university's East Campus; the arena is southwest of Maestri Field, home to the UNO baseball team.

Sports

Basketball
Lakefront Arena is the home venue for both the New Orleans Privateers men's and women's basketball teams. The arena opened November 26, 1983, when UNO hosted in-state rival LSU in a basketball doubleheader.

The arena hosted the 1991 NCAA Women's basketball Final Four, where the University of Tennessee beat the University of Virginia for their third national title. The arena was contracted to host the men's and women's Sun Belt Conference basketball tournaments between 2014 and 2019.  The arena previously hosted the 2002 men's Sun Belt Conference basketball tournament.

The arena is also notable for hosting Larry Bird's career-high of 60 points on March 12, 1985, against the Atlanta Hawks, who were hosting a series of special "home" games in New Orleans during the 1984–1985 season.

The Harlem Globetrotters have also played at the arena.

Boxing
On July 14, 2018, a full card was held at the arena with a co-main event of Regis Prograis versus Juan Jose Velasco for the WBC Super Lightweight Diamond Belt and William Silva versus Teófimo López for the WBC Continental Americas title.

MMA
UFC 27 was held at the arena in September 2000.

Roller derby
Lakefront Arena plays host to flat-track roller derby games held by the Big Easy Rollergirls, a member league of the Women's Flat Track Derby Association, and the New Orleans Brass Roller Derby, a member league of the Men's Roller Derby Association. These games include the Big Easy Rollergirls' annual "SweatFest" invitational tournament, which features competition among high-ranking WFTDA leagues.

Swimming and diving
The UNO Aquatic Center is located in the arena and on the arena grounds. It has been home to the UNO men's and women's swimming and diving teams. The aquatic center has also hosted many national and state events including Sugar Bowl Swimming meets, AAU National Championships and Junior Olympics, LHSAA State meets, Syncro National competition, and hosted the 2010 Short Course and Long Course state meets.

Volleyball
From 2008 to 2011, the arena along with the Human Performance Center were the home venues for the New Orleans Privateers volleyball team.

Wrestling
The arena hosted LHSAA state wrestling tournaments in 1996 and 1998.

Professional wrestling
On October 23, 1993, World Championship Wrestling held its Halloween Havoc pay-per-view at Lakefront Arena.

Ring of Honor wrestling's Supercard of Honor XII was hosted at Lakefront Arena on April 7, 2018 during WrestleMania 34 weekend. The arena also hosted several house shows during the 1980s.

All Elite Wrestling hosted it's flagship TV show, Dynamite, at the arena on 13 April, 2022 which included hometown star Ricky Starks.

Events
The arena also hosts graduations and concerts, such as 3 Doors Down, 311, AC/DC, Aerosmith, Anthrax, Alanis Morissette, Blink-182, Brandy, Britney Spears, Carrie Underwood, Christina Aguilera, The Cure, Daughtry, Def Leppard, Demi Lovato, Eric Church, Exodus, for KING & COUNTRY, Great White, Guns N' Roses, Helloween, Kid Rock, Kix, Korn, Lady Gaga, Limp Bizkit, Mötley Crüe, Nas, Ne-Yo, Poison, Rammstein, Ratt, Pearl Jam, Nirvana,   Red Hot Chili Peppers, R.E.M., Rush, Scorpions, Skid Row, Slipknot, Tesla, The Black Keys, The Grateful Dead, Widespread Panic, Tom Petty, Trixter, Van Halen, Warrant, White Lion, Whitesnake, Xandria and Zac Brown Band. Sting performed during his Symphonicities Tour on June 26, 2010, along with the Royal Philharmonic Orchestra. During their Walking Into Everywhere tour, Jimmy Page and Robert Plant performed on October 1, 1998 and the show was recorded for later broadcast by Westwood One.

Events held at the arena have included Disney on Ice, Sesame Street Live, Shrine Circus, So You Think You Can Dance: The Tour, WWE and Fox's singer search program The X Factor.

Comedians such as Bill Cosby, Robin Williams, Katt Williams and Dave Chappelle have performed at the venue.

Pope John Paul II celebrated mass to over 150,000 people on the grounds of the arena and prominent political figures such as Bill Clinton and John Kerry have also spoken at the arena.

Large festivals, including Lollapalooza and Steel Pony Express have also been held on the grounds.

Hurricane Katrina
In August 2005, as a result of massive damages sustained during Hurricane Katrina, the building closed for substantial repairs and renovations for nearly three years. During this time, the school's men's and women's basketball teams played their home games in their former home, the Human Performance Center (or "The Chamber of Horrors" as it grew to be known during the late '70s and early '80s).

The arena held its grand re-opening May 2, 2008. Disney's High School Musical: The Ice Tour was the first show to perform.

Gallery

See also
List of NCAA Division I basketball arenas
List of music venues

References

Basketball venues in New Orleans
Boxing venues in New Orleans
College basketball venues in the United States
College volleyball venues in the United States
Indoor arenas in New Orleans
Mixed martial arts venues in Louisiana
New Orleans Privateers men's basketball
New Orleans Privateers women's basketball
New Orleans Privateers women's volleyball
Swimming venues in New Orleans
Volleyball venues in New Orleans
Wrestling venues in New Orleans
Atlanta Hawks venues
Music venues in Louisiana
1983 establishments in Louisiana
Sports venues completed in 1983